The Cathedral of Our Lady of Mount Carmel  (Katedral Santa Maria Bunda Karmel) is a Roman Catholic cathedral in Malang, East Java, Indonesia, and seat of the Roman Catholic Diocese of Malang.

The cathedral was built in 1934 in the neo-gothic style by architect L. Estourgie, and is an example of the Dutch colonial architectural heritage in the city. It was originally named for St Teresa but was renamed in 1961.

References

Religious buildings and structures in East Java
Roman Catholic cathedrals in Indonesia
Roman Catholic churches completed in 1934
Churches in Java
1934 establishments in the Dutch East Indies
20th-century Roman Catholic church buildings in Indonesia